Buhse is a surname. Notable people with this surname include:

Friedrich Alexander Buhse (1821–1898), Baltic-German botanist
Rudolf Buhse (1905–1997), German military officer
Werner Buhse, German sports shooter
Willms Buhse (born 1970), German business executive, author, speaker, and consultant